Fieser is a surname. Notable people with the surname include:

James Fieser, American philosopher and academic
Louis Fieser (1899–1977), American organic chemist
Mary Peters Fieser (1909–1997), American chemist, wife of Louis

See also
Fišer